The  Edmonton Eskimos season was the 51st season for the team in the Canadian Football League and their 60th overall. The Eskimos finished 4th in the West Division, but made the playoffs because of the "crossover" rule. Edmonton became the first West team to win the East Semi-Final. The Eskimos attempted to win their 14th Grey Cup championship, but they lost the East Final to the Montreal Alouettes.

Offseason

CFL Draft
In the 2008 CFL Draft, 48 players were chosen from among 752 eligible players from Canadian universities across the country, as well as Canadian players playing in the NCAA. The first two rounds were broadcast on TSN.ca with host Rod Black.

Transactions

*Later traded to the Calgary Stampeders
**Later traded to the BC Lions

Preseason

Schedule

Regular season

Roster

Season standings

Season schedule

Total attendance: 336,449
Average attendance: 37,383 (62.8%)

Ron Lancaster
On Thursday, September 18, Ron Lancaster, 69, died from an apparent heart attack, less than two months after being diagnosed with lung cancer.
Despite working in television, Lancaster returned to football as the Eskimos' head coach in 1991. During his seven-season tenure as Edmonton's head coach, the Eskimos won the 1993 Grey Cup. Lancaster resigned as the Eskimos' head coach after the 1997 season to become the Hamilton Tiger-Cats' head coach and director of football operations.

Player stats

Passing

Rushing

Receiving

Defence

Kickoffs

Kicking

Punting

Returning

Awards and records
Kamau Peterson (WR), Edmonton Eskimos – CFL's Most Outstanding Canadian Award
Ricky Ray, Led CFL, Passing Yards (5,861)
Ricky Ray, Led West Division, Passing Attempts (605)
Ricky Ray, Led West Division, Passing Completions (422)
Ricky Ray, Led CFL, Passing Completion (69.8%)

All-Star selections
 Patrick Kabongo, CFL Western All-Star, Offence
 Kamau Peterson, CFL Western All-Star, Offence
 Dario Romero, CFL Western All-Star, Defence

Milestones

Playoffs
The Eskimos advanced to the East Division playoffs as "crossover" being that they had a better record than Toronto.  By defeating Winnipeg, Edmonton became the first crossover team from the West to win an Eastern semi-final.

East semi-final
Date and time: Saturday, November 8, 12:00 PM Central Standard TimeVenue: Canad Inns Stadium, Winnipeg, Manitoba

East final
Date and time: Saturday, November 15, 1:00 PM Eastern Standard TimeVenue: Olympic Stadium, Montreal, Quebec

References

Edmonton Eskimos
Edmonton Elks seasons